Shizune is an Italian post-hardcore band from Lonigo, formed in 2011. They released their self-titled debut EP and their second EP Mono no Aware: eternity/burial in 2012, followed by their debut studio album Le Voyageur Imprudent which was released in 2015 through Dog Knights Productions.

Shizune are noted for the variety of languages used for their lyrics  (Italian, English, Japanese, French) and for mixing influences from Raein, La Quiete, Envy (band) and Touché Amoré.

Discography

Studio Albums/EPs
 2012 - shizune s/t EP
 2012 - Mono no aware: eternity | burial EP
 2015 - Le voyageur imprudent LP (Dog Knights Productions)
 2017 - CHEAT DEATH, LIVE DEAD! 

Split EPs
 2013 - shizune / minus tree split (Annoying Records)
 2014 - shizune / tfa / infro / tall ships set sails split (Driftwood Records)
 2019 - Shizune / Lytic (Zegema Beach Records)

Compilations
 2014 - Retro engineering artifacts discography (Driftwood Records)
 2017 - The first five years discography (Hesitation Records) 

Other
 2013 - Il coraggio di essere suonati CD

References

External links
 Shizune on Discogs

Italian musical groups
Screamo musical groups
Emo revival groups
Musical groups established in 2011
2011 establishments in Italy